The 1957 New Zealand National Party leadership election was held to choose the next leader of the New Zealand National Party. The election was won by  MP Keith Holyoake.

Background 
By 1956 Sidney Holland’s health was beginning to fail. His memory began to deteriorate and he lost much energy which he needed for work. In October 1956 he suffered either a mild heart attack or stroke while working in his office during the Suez Crisis. The following year a group of senior cabinet ministers led by Keith Holyoake, Jack Marshall, Jack Watts and party president, Alex McKenzie, persuaded Holland (who was reluctant to go) to resign citing his health deterioration. Holland announced his retirement from the leadership at the National's annual conference in Christchurch on 12 August 1957. Almost immediately after finishing his speech he collapsed backstage and was rushed to hospital by an ambulance.

Candidates

Keith Holyoake 
Holyoake was a senior member of Holland's government. He served as Deputy Prime Minister, Minister of Agriculture and Minister of Marketing. He had been seen for years as a potential leader and was often predicted to be the one to succeed Adam Hamilton as National's leader, however he was hampered in this after losing his seat in the 1938 election.

Others 
The only other possible successor to Holland was his Minister of Labour, Bill Sullivan. He was seen as leadership material being straight-talking, tough, energetic and resolute and when Holland's health began to fail Sullivan was speculated as being a possible Prime Minister. However Sullivan had resigned from Parliament in February 1957, following the death of his son Bruce, ruling out the possibility of a candidature.

Result 
Holland named Holyoake as his preferred successor as party leader upon his resignation and in the following caucus meeting he was unanimously elected as National's third party leader. Holyoake's elevation to the leadership left the deputy spot vacant. Attorney-General Jack Marshall defeated Minister of Finance Jack Watts for the position.

Aftermath 
Holyoake served as Prime Minister for two months before the general election that year, making only modest changes to cabinet. After Holland's resignation he was knighted and made a Minister without portfolio by Holyoake before retiring from Parliament at the 1957 election, which National went on to lose, claiming 39 seats to Labour's 41.

Notes

References

National Party leadership
1957
New Zealand National Party leadership election